Deep Stream is tributary of the Taieri River in Otago, New Zealand. The stream runs generally eastwards for some 70 kilometres from its source on the slopes of Lammerlaw in the Lammerlaw Range (at ), reaching the Taieri River near Hindon in the Taieri Gorge.

A railway junction was located at the junction of the Deep Stream and the Taieri, also called Deep Stream, which was on the Otago Central Railway. The line is still used by Dunedin Railways, but the station was closed in 1954 and no longer exists. 

Trout fishing with grasshoppers was popular on the stream.

The stream shares its name with several other much shorter streams in the Canterbury and Southland Regions of New Zealand.

References

Rivers of Otago
Taieri River
Rivers of New Zealand